Radical Mestizo, a live album by Shooglenifty, was released in 2005 on the Compass Records label.

Track listing
 "She's in the Attic" – 5:51
 "Glenuig Hall" – 4:46
 "The Arms Dealer's Daughter" – 7:18
 "Nordal Rumba" – 5:54
 "Carboni's Farewell" – 6:56
 "Delighted" – 6:01
 "Schumann's Leap" – 4:11
 "Heading West" – 5:15
 "A Fistful of Euro" – 7:12
 "Scraping the Barrel" – 6:26

Sources and links
 

Shooglenifty albums
2005 live albums